Gerardus Wilhelmus Maria Huijsmans (later known as Huysmans) (29 April 1902 – 18 March 1948) was a Dutch politician.

Huijsmans was born in Eindhoven.  He was Dutch Minister for Finance in 1945 and Minister of the Economy from 1946 to 1948. He died in The Hague, aged 45.

Sources
HUIJSMANS, Gerardus Wilhelmus Maria (1902-1948) at historici.nl

1902 births
1948 deaths
Catholic People's Party politicians
20th-century Dutch politicians
Dutch bankers
Ministers of Economic Affairs of the Netherlands
Ministers of Finance of the Netherlands
People from Eindhoven
20th-century  Dutch economists